The Aarhus Theatre (Danish: Aarhus Teater) in Aarhus, is the largest provincial theatre in Denmark.

The present theatre house was constructed in the late 19th century, as a replacement for the old theatre, nicknamed "Svedekassen" (The Sweat-box). Since Aarhus had grown to become Jutland's biggest city during the 19th century, the old theatre had become too small to serve the public demand. A new building was designed by the Danish architect Hack Kampmann (1856–1920), and the construction began on 12 August 1898. Only two years later, Aarhus Theatre stood completed and was inaugurated on 15 September 1900.

The architectural style of the building is Art Nouveau, with the national romantic emphasis on natural materials, and the interior design was completed by artists Hansen Reistrup and Hans Tegner.

In 2007, the Aarhus Theatre received an audio make-over.

Aarhus Theatre School
The Aarhus Theater offers two 4-year programs for students to train in acting or play writing.

References

External links

Official Homepage of Aarhus Theatre (in Danish)

Theatres completed in 1900
Hack Kampmann buildings
Listed theatres in Denmark
Theatres in Aarhus
Listed buildings in Aarhus
Tourist attractions in Aarhus
Art Nouveau architecture in Denmark
Art Nouveau theatres
Coffeehouses and cafés in Aarhus